George William Beauchamp (9 March 1888 – 5 April 1965) was a British sailor and Titanic survivor. On the Titanic, he worked as a stoker and was rescued in Boat #13 (ordered on board by an officer to handle an oar), which was launched from the vessel at 1:40 am, shortly before the sinking.

Biography
He was born in Totton, England, UK, in March 1888, the son of George Beauchamp and Maria Jane Walton. He had five siblings.

Titanic
On the Titanic he was paid £6 a month.

He later recalled that the water was up to his feet. Beauchamp ran towards the topside and positioned on the starboard deck. Beauchamp's boat was later rescued by the Carpathia around 6.30 am. 

He said at the British inquiry that immediately after the collision, the watertight doors and dampers began to block and that there was an order to "stop" (it all). He also testified that as a stoker, he was given the order to draw fires in the boilers (the fires that normally kept the ship's steam machinery running). After drawing the fires, he was relieved and escaped using a ladder. He later recalled helping ladies and children into the boats before being given the order to board lifeboat #13. He said there were around 60 to 70 people on board, among them many men. As a last thing he said there was no lantern on the boat.

British inquiry
Beauchamp gave evidence at the British Wreck Commissioner's inquiry into the sinking of the RMS Titanic before counsel Raymond Asquith, where he responded to several questions with blunt and short responses. Excerpts:

"I went ... on to the boat deck and across to the starboard side, I had one foot on the deck and one on the lifeboat and I was helping ladies and children into the lifeboat. We had difficulty keeping the lifeboat away from the ship's side and prevent[ing] water coming in."

"We pulled on the oars to get away as far as possible from the suction of the ship as it went down. I saw the ship go down bow first and I could still see the stern and then that went too. It was a roar like thunder as it went down and I heard cries as the ship sank."

"We would have gone back for others but we were full up."

Later life
George Beauchamp continued to work at sea into the 1920s and beyond. He later served on the Cape Mail boats for the Union Line as a leading fireman.

Later in life, Beauchamp became a docker in Southampton.

He became friends with Bertram Vere Dean, who was the brother of the last Titanic survivor, Millvina Dean.

Death
Beauchamp died in April of 1965 at the age of 77.

References

External links
 Testimony of George William Beauchamp in the British Titanic inquiry

1888 births
1965 deaths
RMS Titanic survivors
British Merchant Service personnel of World War I